Tampere Day is an annual celebration in Finland, held on October 1, to celebrate the city of Tampere; on that date, Tampere was granted full city rights in 1779. Tampere Day has been celebrated since 1955, when the decision to celebrate Tampere Day was made by the city government in 1954. Tampere Day is associated with many events where the city's agencies and institutions, as well as many companies, associations and communities, present their activities. The program also includes guided tours, among other things. In addition, the city will host an official gala reception for invited guests at the Tampere City Hall.

Tens of thousands of city dwellers take part in the events of Tampere Day every year. Popular places to visit have included local fire stations. In 2020, Tampere Day was celebrated online, as traditional public events were not organized due to the COVID-19 situation.

See also
 Helsinki Day

References

External links
 Official site of the Tampere Day
 Tampere Day at City of Tampere

Events in Tampere
Recurring events established in 1955
October observances